The 1949 Nevada Wolf Pack football team was an American football team that represented the University of Nevada as an independent during the 1949 college football season. In its third season under head coach Joe Sheeketski, the Wolf Pack compiled a 5–5 record and outscored opponents by a total of 235 to 212.

Schedule

References

Nevada
Nevada Wolf Pack football seasons
Nevada Wolf Pack football